Çifteler is a town and district of Eskişehir Province in the Central Anatolia region of Turkey. According to 2000 census, population of the district is 16,716 of which 11,872 live in the town of Çifteler.

Notable natives
 Abdil Ceylan (born 1983), Olympic long-distance runner
Gurer Aykal (born 1942), Conductor

Notes

References

External links
 Eskişehir governor's official website 
 Map of Çifteler district

Towns in Turkey
Populated places in Eskişehir Province
Districts of Eskişehir Province